The Catherine Wolfe Bruce Gold Medal is awarded every year by the Astronomical Society of the Pacific for outstanding lifetime contributions to astronomy. It is named after Catherine Wolfe Bruce, an American patroness of astronomy, and was first awarded in 1898.

List of Bruce Medalists 
Source: Astronomical Society of the Pacific

 1898 – Simon Newcomb
 1899 – Arthur Auwers
 1900 – David Gill
 1902 – Giovanni V. Schiaparelli
 1904 – William Huggins
 1906 – Hermann Carl Vogel
 1908 – Edward C. Pickering
 1909 – George William Hill
 1911 – Henri Poincaré
 1913 – Jacobus C. Kapteyn
 1914 – Oskar Backlund
 1915 – William Wallace Campbell
 1916 – George Ellery Hale
 1917 – Edward Emerson Barnard
 1920 – Ernest W. Brown
 1921 – Henri A. Deslandres
 1922 – Frank W. Dyson
 1923 – Benjamin Baillaud
 1924 – Arthur Stanley Eddington
 1925 – Henry Norris Russell
 1926 – Robert G. Aitken
 1927 – Herbert Hall Turner
 1928 – Walter S. Adams
 1929 – Frank Schlesinger
 1930 – Max Wolf
 1931 – Willem de Sitter
 1932 – John S. Plaskett
 1933 – Carl V.L. Charlier
 1934 – Alfred Fowler
 1935 – Vesto M. Slipher
 1936 – Armin O. Leuschner
 1937 – Ejnar Hertzsprung
 1938 – Edwin P. Hubble
 1939 – Harlow Shapley
 1940 – Frederick H. Seares
 1941 – Joel Stebbins
 1942 – Jan H. Oort
 1945 – E. Arthur Milne
 1946 – Paul Merrill
 1947 – Bernard Lyot
 1948 – Otto Struve
 1949 – Harold Spencer Jones
 1950 – Alfred H. Joy
 1951 – Marcel Minnaert
 1952 – Subrahmanyan Chandrasekhar
 1953 – Harold D. Babcock
 1954 – Bertil Lindblad
 1955 – Walter Baade
 1956 – Albrecht Unsöld
 1957 – Ira S. Bowen
 1958 – William Wilson Morgan
 1959 – Bengt Strömgren
 1960 – Viktor A. Ambartsumian
 1961 – Rudolph Minkowski
 1962 – Grote Reber
 1963 – Seth Barnes Nicholson
 1964 – Otto Heckmann
 1965 – Martin Schwarzschild
 1966 – Dirk Brouwer
 1967 – Ludwig Biermann
 1968 – Willem J. Luyten
 1969 – Horace W. Babcock
 1970 – Fred Hoyle
 1971 – Jesse Greenstein
 1972 – Iosif S. Shklovskii
 1973 – Lyman Spitzer Jr.
 1974 – Martin Ryle
 1975 – Allan R. Sandage
 1976 – Ernst J. Öpik
 1977 – Bart J. Bok
 1978 – Hendrik C. van de Hulst
 1979 – William A. Fowler
 1980 – George Herbig
 1981 – Riccardo Giacconi
 1982 – E. Margaret Burbidge
 1983 – Yakov B. Zel'dovich
 1984 – Olin C. Wilson
 1985 – Thomas G. Cowling
 1986 – Fred L. Whipple
 1987 – Edwin E. Salpeter
 1988 – John G. Bolton
 1989 – Adriaan Blaauw
 1990 – Charlotte E. Moore Sitterly
 1991 – Donald E. Osterbrock
 1992 – Maarten Schmidt
 1993 – Martin Rees
 1994 – Wallace Sargent
 1995 – P. James E. Peebles
 1996 – Albert E. Whitford
 1997 – Eugene Parker
 1998 – Donald Lynden-Bell
 1999 – Geoffrey R. Burbidge
 2000 – Rashid A. Sunyaev
 2001 – Hans A. Bethe
 2002 – Bohdan Paczyński
 2003 – Vera C. Rubin
 2004 – Chūshirō Hayashi
 2005 – Robert Kraft
 2006 – Frank J. Low
 2007 – Martin Harwit
 2008 – Sidney van den Bergh
 2009 – Frank H. Shu
 2010 – Gerry Neugebauer
 2011 – Jeremiah P. Ostriker
 2012 – Sandra M. Faber
 2013 – James E. Gunn
 2014 – Kenneth Kellermann
 2015 – Douglas N. C. Lin
 2016 – Andrew Fabian
 2017 – Nick Scoville
 2018 – Tim Heckman
 2019 – Martha P. Haynes
 2020 – Prize suspended due to COVID-19 pandemic
 2021 - Bruce Elmegreen

See also

 List of astronomy awards
 Prizes named after people
 Sonoma State's Directory

References

External links 
 20th Century Astronomers

Astronomy prizes
Awards established in 1898